Børre Erik Falkum-Hansen (13 August 1919 – 24 June 2006) was a Norwegian sailor and Olympic medalist. He was born and died in Oslo.

He received a silver medal in the 5.5 metre class with the boat Encore at the 1952 Summer Olympics in Helsinki, together with Peder Lunde and Peder's wife "Babben".

References

External links
 

1919 births
2006 deaths
Norwegian male sailors (sport)
Olympic sailors of Norway
Olympic silver medalists for Norway
Olympic medalists in sailing
Medalists at the 1952 Summer Olympics
Sailors at the 1952 Summer Olympics – 5.5 Metre
Sportspeople from Oslo